South Pasadena is the name of two places in the United States:

South Pasadena, California
South Pasadena, Florida